La Lumiere School is a college preparatory boarding and day school located on a 190-acre campus in Springfield Township, LaPorte County, Indiana, United States.

About
La Lumiere School is affiliated with several educational associations:

 Catholic Boarding Schools Association
 National Association of Independent Schools
 Association of Boarding Schools
 Midwest Boarding Schools Association

La Lumiere School receives accreditation from the:

 Independent Schools Association of the Central States
 North Central Association

Demographics
The demographic breakdown of the 215 students enrolled in 2013–14 was:
Native American/Alaskan – 0.4%
Asian/Pacific islanders – 0.9%
Black – 10.7%
Hispanic – 9.5%
White – 81.4%
Multiracial – 5.1%

Notable alumni

 Jeremy Sochan - Small Forward for the San Antonio Spurs and formerly for the Baylor Bears
Jaden Ivey - Shooting Guard for the Detroit Pistons and formerly for the Purdue Boilermakers men's basketball
 James Banks III (born 1998) - Center for NBA G League Texas Legends; affiliate of the NBA's Dallas Mavericks
 Paris Barclay - Director, producer
 Brian Bowen –  Small Forward for NBA G League Iowa Wolves; affiliate of the NBA's Minnesota Timberwolves
 Tyger Campbell - Point Guard for the UCLA Bruins
 Jim Gaffigan – Stand-up comedian
 John P. Hiler – US Representative from Indiana's 3rd congressional district (1981–1991)
 Jaren Jackson Jr. - Power Forward/Center for the Memphis Grizzlies
 Jordan Poole - Shooting Guard for Golden State Warriors
 John Roberts – Chief Justice of the United States, appointed in 2005
Isaiah Stewart - Power Forward/Center for the Detroit Pistons

See also
 List of high schools in Indiana

References

External links
 La Lumiere School website

Private high schools in Indiana
Independent School Association of the Central States
Educational institutions established in 1963
Schools in LaPorte County, Indiana
Boarding schools in Indiana
1963 establishments in Indiana
Catholic secondary schools in Indiana
Catholic boarding schools in the United States
Roman Catholic Diocese of Gary